Bloomington Cemetery, historically called the First Presbyterian Church of Oak Grove Cemetery, is a cemetery in Bloomington, Minnesota, United States. Established in 1856, its pioneer and  Dakota burials and 1890 soldiers' monument reflect the city's transition from frontier settlement to participant in state affairs like military service. Missionary Gideon Pond is buried there.

References

External links
 Bloomington City Cemetery
 

1856 establishments in Minnesota Territory
Cemeteries on the National Register of Historic Places in Minnesota
National Register of Historic Places in Hennepin County, Minnesota